Donald Miranda (born 19 October 1972) is a retired Italian diver.

He was born in Turin. At the 2000 Olympic Games he finished 16th in the 3 metre springboard event and eighth together with Nicola Marconi in the synchronized 3 metre springboard event. At time of competition, he weighed 75 kg (165 lbs) and stood at 180 cm (5 ft 10 1/2 in.)

References

1972 births
Living people
Italian male divers
Divers at the 2000 Summer Olympics
Olympic divers of Italy
Divers of Centro Sportivo Carabinieri
20th-century Italian people
21st-century Italian people